Biggy may refer to:

 William J. Biggy, former San Francisco chief of police
 a misspelling of Biggie, alternative name of rapper The Notorious B.I.G.
 "Biggy", a character from Gold for the Tough Guys of the Prairie
 "'Biggy' Brix", a comics character, see Lieutenant Marvels
 "Biggy", a character from They Came to Rob Hong Kong
 "Jonathan Ignasius Salvatore 'Biggy' Jones", a character from Tough Guys of the Prairie

See also
 Big (disambiguation)
 Biggie (disambiguation)